The England national cricket team toured the West Indies from January to April 1974 and played a five-match Test series against the West Indies cricket team which was drawn 1–1. England were captained by Mike Denness; the West Indies by Rohan Kanhai.

Test series summary

First Test

Second Test

Third Test

Fourth Test

Fifth Test

References

1974 in English cricket
1974 in West Indian cricket
1973-74
International cricket competitions from 1970–71 to 1975
West Indian cricket seasons from 1970–71 to 1999–2000